Leonardo "Léo" Weschenfelder Scienza (born 13 September 1998) is a Brazilian professional footballer who plays as winger or attacking midfielder for 2. Bundesliga club 1. FC Magdeburg.

Club career
Before the 2020 season, Scienza signed for Swedish fifth tier side Fanna. In 2020, he signed for Schalke in the German fourth tier. In 2022, he signed for 2. Bundesliga club 1. FC Magdeburg. On 16 July 2022, Scienza debuted for Magdeburg during a 2–1 loss to Fortuna Düsseldorf.

International career
Scienza is eligible to represent Luxembourg internationally.

References

External links
 Léo Scienza at playmakerstats.com 

1998 births
Living people
Brazilian people of Luxembourgian descent
Brazilian footballers
Division 3 (Swedish football) players
2. Bundesliga players
Regionalliga players
Clube Esportivo Lajeadense players
FC Schalke 04 II players
1. FC Magdeburg players
Brazilian expatriate footballers
Brazilian expatriate sportspeople in Germany
Expatriate footballers in Germany
Brazilian expatriate sportspeople in Sweden
Expatriate footballers in Sweden